Bargain with Bullets is a 1937 American film. The first film produced by  Million Dollar Productions, it features an African American cast of actors and performers. The gangster film is about the Harlem underworld.  It was described as the first Hollywood "all-Negro" film. The film features several musical performances.

Toddy Pictures Company acquired Million Dollar Productions and re-released the film as Gangsters on the Loose.

The gangster themed film drew scrutiny from film censorship boards in the U.S. requiring extensive editing of the film.

Cast
Ralph Cooper as Mugsy "Killer" Moore
Theresa Harris
Frances Turham
Lawrence Criner
Clarence Brooks

See also
Dark Manhattan

References

External links
 

1937 films
American gangster films
American black-and-white films
Race films
1930s English-language films
1930s American films